A list of films produced by the Israeli film industry in 1972.

1972 releases

Unknown premiere date

See also
1972 in Israel

References

External links
 Israeli films of 1972 at the Internet Movie Database

Lists of 1972 films by country or language
Film
1972